Manglora, also spelled Monglora or Monglara, is a village on the Narbal-Tangmarg road in the Baramulla district of the union territory of Jammu and Kashmir. It comes under tehsil Kunzer.

Economy
People are mostly engaged in agriculture, with some employed in the public sector. Orchards are also owned by many families. 
A farm science centre (Krishi Vigyan Kendra) is being built nearby. A power distribution station is also located in the village. Accommodation facilities are available for tourists in hotel Apple Tree Resorts and there are other wayside facilities also for tourists.

Religion
All people follow Islam. A Sufi shrine is located to east of the village.

Geography
Batpora and Kunzer lie  to its west. On the East, lie Dhobiwan and Lalpora. Wussan and Sahipora lie towards the South and Hardbani is located towards the North.

Languages
Kashmiri is the main language spoken.

References

Villages in Baramulla district